The Short Line Subdivision is a railroad line owned and operated by CSX Transportation in the U.S. state of West Virginia. The line runs from Clarksburg west to New Martinsville along a former Baltimore and Ohio Rail Road line. Its east end is at the west end of the Bridgeport Subdivision; its west end is at the Ohio River Subdivision.

History
The line was opened in 1900 by the West Virginia Short Line Railroad. It became part of the B&O and CSX through leases and mergers.

References

CSX Transportation lines
Rail infrastructure in West Virginia
Baltimore and Ohio Railroad lines